The Nebelhorn Trophy is an international senior-level figure skating competition organized by the Deutsche Eislauf-Union and held annually in Oberstdorf, Germany. It became part of the ISU Challenger Series in the 2014–15 season.

The competition is named after the Nebelhorn, a nearby mountain. It is usually one of the first international senior competitions of the season. Skaters are entered by their respective national federations and compete in four disciplines: men's singles, ladies' singles, pairs, and ice dancing. The Fritz-Geiger-Memorial Trophy is presented to the team with the highest placements across all disciplines.

History
The Nebelhorn Trophy competition has been held annually since 1969 and is thus one of the oldest international figure skating competitions that remains in existence. In its early years, this competition was paired with a now-defunct French event, the Grand Prix International St. Gervais (unrelated to the current ISU Grand Prix of Figure Skating event), to form the Coupe des Alpes, with many of the same skaters participating in both events and a team trophy presented to the country with the highest combined placements across both competitions. During the 1980s and early 1990s, before the establishment of a regular junior international competition circuit, younger skaters were often sent to these events as their first senior international competition assignments. International Figure Skating calls the event "unique" because they are, along with their medals, are awarded trophies.

In recent years, the Nebelhorn Trophy has also been used by the International Skating Union to experiment with new judging and scoring systems for figure skating. Specifically, the 1997 competition was used as the test event for the switch from the "best of majority" ordinal system to the "one-by-one" method; the 2002 event was used for an initial test of the ISU Judging System which was then under development, and the 2003 event was the first competition where that system was used to determine the official results; and the 2006 event was used for a trial of using separate panels of judges for technical elements and program components. The competition also serves as a testing ground for judges working towards international status.

The 2009 competition was used as the final qualifying opportunity for the 2010 Winter Olympics and the 2013 event served the same purpose for the 2014 Olympics and the 2018 Olympics. The Nebelhorn Trophy became part of the ISU Challenger Series in the 2014–15 season.

Medalists
CS: ISU Challenger Series

Men

Ladies

Pairs

Ice dancing

References

Sources
 Benjamin T. Wright, Skating in America.

External links

 Deutsche Eislauf-Union (German Ice Skating Union)
 1997 Results
 2001 Results

 
ISU Challenger Series
International figure skating competitions hosted by Germany
Sports competitions in Oberstdorf